Lewis F. Sherman (February 10, 1917 – November 22, 1974) was a member of the California State Senate for the 8th district from 1967 to 1971. During World War II, he served in the United States Army flying 90 missions over Europe. During his term, he helped pass legislation to keep B.A.R.T. financed. After his term as state senator, he was assigned as a municipal judge and a Superior Court judge by Governor Reagan.

References

United States Army personnel of World War II
Republican Party California state senators
20th-century American politicians
1917 births
1974 deaths